The Biscay campaign of June 1795 consisted of a series of manoeuvres and two battles fought between the British Channel Fleet and the French Atlantic Fleet off the Southern coast of Brittany in the Bay of Biscay during the French Revolutionary Wars. In late May 1795, a British battle squadron of six ships of the line under Vice-Admiral William Cornwallis was sent by Admiral Lord Bridport to enforce the blockade of the French port of Brest, the home port of the French Atlantic Fleet. On 8 June, Cornwallis discovered a convoy of merchant vessels travelling from Bordeaux to Brest under the protection of a small squadron under Contre-amiral Jean Gaspard Vence. Cornwallis attacked the convoy, Vence retreating under the protection of batteries on the fortified island of Belle Île as Cornwallis seized eight ships from the convoy. As Cornwallis sent his prizes back to Britain the main French fleet at Brest under Vice-amiral Villaret de Joyeuse put to sea to protect Vence's remaining ships.

On 16 June, Cornwallis's squadron encountered Villaret's fleet, in conjunction with Vence's force, off Penmarck Point. Cornwallis had misunderstood the signals from Captain Robert Stopford on the scouting frigate HMS Phaeton and had sailed much too close to the larger French fleet. When he realised his error, the British admiral turned his squadron westwards, retreating away from the French coast with Villaret's force in pursuit. Light winds and poorly loaded ships delayed his escape, and on 17 June the French vanguard caught up with his rearguard. Throughout the day the French and British ships exchanged fire and by the late afternoon the rearmost British ship HMS Mars was in danger of being overwhelmed. Cornwallis responded by interposing his 100-gun flagship HMS Royal Sovereign between the British and French forces. The heavy broadsides of the flagship drove back the French and soon afterwards Villaret recalled his ships, concerned by sails on the horizon which he may have believed to be the rest of the Channel Fleet, although in reality they were a British merchant convoy. The battle is known in British histories as Cornwallis's Retreat.

Villaret retreated towards Brest, but was driven south by a storm on 18 June. Unbeknownst to either Cornwallis or Villaret, the main Channel Fleet was already at sea, protecting an expeditionary force carrying a French Royalist army intended to invade Quiberon, the convoy under the command of Commodore Sir John Borlase Warren. On 22 June, Warren's scouts identified the French fleet at sea off the coastal island of Groix and he took the convoy further out to sea away from the French, who did not pursue, and sent word to Bridport. The British admiral placed his fleet between the French and the expeditionary force, Villaret falling back towards the sheltered anchorage between Groix and the port of Lorient. Light winds delayed both fleets, but on the morning of 23 June Bridport's vanguard overran the rearmost French ships. Villaret attempted to effect a fighting withdrawal, but several of his captains ignored his orders, throwing the retreat into disorder. Three French ships were captured and the rest scattered along the nearby French coast. Although a renewed attack might have destroyed the entire French fleet Bridport, concerned his ships might be wrecked, withdrew unexpectedly. The action is known as the Battle of Groix.

The campaign was a strategic victory for the British; the remainder of the French fleet was forced to shelter in Lorient, from which they were unable to sail again until 1796. The expeditionary force landed safely in Quiberon but the operation ended in disaster, Warren evacuating the survivors a month later. Bridport remained cruising with his fleet off the Breton Coast until September, before handing over control to Rear-Admiral Henry Harvey. The battle was controversial in both countries, British commentators observing that Bridport had missed a unique opportunity to completely destroy the French Atlantic fleet, while in France a series of courts-martial were held to try those officers who were felt to have disobeyed orders: two were dismissed from the French Navy.

British fleet
Note that as carronades were not traditionally taken into consideration when calculating a ship's rate, these ships may have been carrying more guns than indicated below.

Cornwallis's Squadron

Bridport's fleet

Quiberon Expeditionary Force

French fleet
Officers killed in action are marked with a  symbol. Note that as carronades were not traditionally taken into consideration when calculating a ship's rate, these ships may have been carrying more guns than indicated below.

Notes

References

Bibliography
 
 
 
 
 
 
 

Naval battles involving France
Naval battles involving Great Britain
Conflicts in 1795
French Revolutionary Wars orders of battle
Battle